Ismael Díaz de León (born 12 May 1997) is a Panamanian professional footballer who plays as a left winger for Universidad Catolica and the Panama national team.

Club career
Born in Panama City, Díaz made his professional debut for Tauro on 2 September 2012 against Alianza, aged just 15 years and 2 months. He had a trial with Dutch club PSV Eindhoven in summer 2014. In August 2015, he joined Portuguese club FC Porto on a loan. On 2017 the loan ended due to FC Porto order.

On 31 August 2019, Díaz joined Académico Viseu. He left the club at the end of the year and returned to Tauro in January 2020.

C.D. Universidad Católica del Ecuador

On January 6, 2022, Ecuadorian 1st Division club Universidad Católica, announced the signing of Ismael Diaz, in time for the start of the 2022 Ecuadorian Serie A season, as well as the 2022 Copa Libertadores.  Diaz had made an immediate impact during his first two weeks at the club, scoring 2 league goals in his first 2 matches, which earned him being selected 'Best player of Matchday 1' of Serie A, and a further 2 goals in the second stage of the Libertadores Cup group stage qualifiers, helping La Católica to a 3-1 aggregate win over Bolivian club Club Bolívar.

International career
He played at the 2013 FIFA U-17 World Cup in the United Arab Emirates and the 2015 FIFA U-20 World Cup in New Zealand.

Díaz made his senior debut for Panama in an August 2014 friendly match against Cuba and has, as of 10 June 2015, earned a total of 2 caps, scoring 1 goal.

In May 2018 he was named in Panama's preliminary 35 man squad for the 2018 FIFA World Cup in Russia.

Career statistics

International

International goals
Scores and results list Panama's goal tally first.

Honours

Club
Porto B
Segunda Liga: 2015–16
Premier League International Cup: 2016–17

International
CONCACAF U-17 Championship: Runner-up 2013
CONCACAF U-20 Championship: Runner-up 2015

References

External links

National team profile - FEPAFUT

1997 births
Living people
Sportspeople from Panama City
Panamanian footballers
Association football forwards
Tauro F.C. players
Liga Portugal 2 players
FC Porto B players
El Tanque Sisley players
Académico de Viseu F.C. players
Segunda División B players
Deportivo Fabril players
2015 CONCACAF U-20 Championship players
2017 CONCACAF Gold Cup players
Panama international footballers
Panamanian expatriate footballers
Expatriate footballers in Portugal
Expatriate footballers in Uruguay
Expatriate footballers in Spain
Panamanian expatriate sportspeople in Spain
Panamanian expatriate sportspeople in Uruguay
2018 FIFA World Cup players